Louis Vittes (1911–1969) was an American screenwriter who mostly wrote for television and low-budget films.

Select filmography
Villa!! (1958)
Showdown at Boot Hill (1959)
I Married a Monster from Outer Space (1959)
The Eyes of Annie Jones (1964)

References

External links
Louis Vittes at IMDb

1911 births
1969 deaths
20th-century American screenwriters